Omar ibn Idris, or Umar Idrismi, Idris Dunama III, was the ruler (or mai) of the Kanem Empire from 1372 to 1380. He moved the capital from Njimi, Kanem to Kaga, located on the western edge of Lake Chad in present day Borno State, Nigeria.

History 
By the end of the 14th century, internal struggles and external attacks had torn Kanem apart. Between 1370 and 1389, six mais reigned, but Bulala invaders (from the area around Lake Fitri to the east) killed five of them. This proliferation of mais resulted in numerous claimants to the throne and led to a series of internecine wars.

Finally, after warring with Kanem since the 1370s, the Bulala people forced the Kanembu people under mai Omar ibn Idris to relocate to Bornu circa 1380, overcoming attacks from their neighbours (Arabs and Berbers, and the Hausa of modern Nigeria), and marked the transition of the beginning of the Bornu Empire. The once strong Sayfawa dynasty was forced out of Kanem and back into the nomadic lifestyle they had abandoned nearly 600 years ago. With the new centre of the empire at Bornu, it became known as the Bornu Empire.

Over time, the intermarriage of the Kanembu and the various original peoples in Bornu contributed to what is now the current people and language, the Kanuri. The Sayfawa dynasty still had control over both capitals and therefore became more powerful than it ever had been so far, and the Bulala and Kanembu states were merged, but political authority still rested in Bornu.

The Kanembu would not fully reconquer their former capital Njimi until the early sixteenth century under Mai Ali Gaji (1497–1515) who was able to defeat the Bulala and retake Njimi, the former capital. The empire's leaders, however, remained at Ngazargamu, the Bornu capital, because its lands were more productive agriculturally and better suited to the raising of cattle.

References 

Ajayi, Jacob Festus Ade, and Michael Crowder (1972). "History of West Africa". New York: Columbia University Press. 
Davidson, Basil (1998). "West Africa before the colonial era: a history to 1850". London: Longman. 
Lange, Dierk (2004). "Ancient kingdoms of West Africa: African-centred and Canaanite-Israelite perspectives; a collection of published and unpublished studies in English and French". Dettelbach, Germany: Röll.
Urvoy, Yves (1949). "L'empire du Bornou". Paris.

External links 

All links retrieved May 29, 2014.

Lange, Dierk. The Chad region as a crossroads Africa and the Ancient World.
Lange, Dierk. The kingdoms and peoples of Chad Africa and the Ancient World.
B. Schemmel. Traditional polities Rulers.org.

Rulers of the Kanem Empire
14th-century monarchs in Africa